The Dabhi is a Rajput clan of Gujarat in India. The name is also found among the Indian Kolis.

Notable people 
People with the surname Dabhi, who may or may not be associated with the clan, include:
 Ajitsinh Dabhi
 Bharatsinhji Dabhi
 Kalabhai Dabhi
 Reena Dabhi

References 

Social groups of Gujarat
Rajput clans of Gujarat
History of Gujarat